Giovanni Battista Locatelli may refer to:
Giovanni Battista Locatelli (opera director)
Giovanni Battista Locatelli (sculptor)